The Festival Dansa-Diawoura festival took place in Bafoulabé in Mali, and in
the surrounding villages, from April 8 to April 10, 2005 in the presence
of Cheick Oumar Sissoko, Minister of Culture and the writer Doumbi Fakoly.

The "dansa" and the "diawoura" are traditional dances of the Khasso country. The Festival Dansa-Diawour ended in the third day of the "Mali Sadio", which commemorates the friendship between the girls of the village and a hippopotamus. In Malinké, "Mali Tchadio" means "hippopotamus which has two colors". Tchadio transformed itself into Sadio. The
hippopotamus was struck down by a French colonel during the French colonial reign.

References
 Le président Touré à Bafoulabé : la voie largement ouverte vers le développement.  M. COULIBALY, l'Essor n°15483 2005-06-28.

Dance festivals in Mali
Malian culture
2005 festivals